Miguel Ángel Sierra (born 23 October 1971) is a Spanish wrestler. He competed in the men's Greco-Roman 57 kg at the 1992 Summer Olympics.

References

External links
 

1971 births
Living people
Spanish male sport wrestlers
Olympic wrestlers of Spain
Wrestlers at the 1992 Summer Olympics
Sportspeople from Seville
20th-century Spanish people